Kenny Churchill (born 10 May 1975) is a British athlete who competes in the javelin throw and shot put in the F37 category of Paralympic events. He is a member of Durham AC.

He has competed in five Summer Paralympics, winning a bronze in 1992 in Barcelona and gold in 1996 in Atlanta, 2000 in Sydney a 2004 in Athens setting a new world record with a throw of 48.09 in the javelin.  He won bronze in shot put in 1996 and finished in 6th place in javelin at the 2008 Paralympics. He also won gold at the International Paralympic Committee Athletics World Championships of 2002, and silver at the 2006 edition of the same Games.

References 

Living people
1975 births
British male javelin throwers
Track and field athletes with cerebral palsy
Athletes (track and field) at the 1992 Summer Paralympics
Athletes (track and field) at the 1996 Summer Paralympics
Athletes (track and field) at the 2000 Summer Paralympics
Athletes (track and field) at the 2004 Summer Paralympics
Athletes (track and field) at the 2008 Summer Paralympics
Paralympic athletes of Great Britain
Paralympic gold medalists for Great Britain
Paralympic bronze medalists for Great Britain
Medalists at the 1992 Summer Paralympics
Medalists at the 1996 Summer Paralympics
Medalists at the 2000 Summer Paralympics
Medalists at the 2004 Summer Paralympics
Paralympic medalists in athletics (track and field)